Beaumont Ratcliffe (1909-2003) was an English footballer who played as a central defender for New Brighton, Oldham Athletic, Reading and Watford.

References

English footballers
Mexborough Athletic F.C. players
Thurnscoe Victoria F.C. players
Bradford (Park Avenue) A.F.C. players
Charlton Athletic F.C. players
New Brighton A.F.C. players
Le Havre AC players
Oldham Athletic A.F.C. players
Reading F.C. players
Watford F.C. players
Runcorn F.C. Halton players
Earlestown F.C. players
1909 births
2003 deaths